Roberto Menichelli (born 14 January 1963), is an Italian retired futsal player and ex coach of the Italian national futsal team. In February 2014, he coached Italy to win the UEFA Futsal Euro 2014 title.

Honours

Player

Club
Torrino
 Serie A: 1992-93, 1993-94.

Torrino
 Coppa Italia: 1990-91, 1991-92, 1992-93, 1993-94, 1994-95.

Manager

Country
Italy
 UEFA Futsal Championship: 2014; (Bronze): 2012
 FIFA Futsal World Cup (Bronze): 2012

Individual
 Panchina d'Oro: 2014

References

External links

1963 births
Living people
Futsal coaches